Raymond O'Connor (born September 13, 1952) is an American character actor.

Career
Raymond O'Connor has been in a number of films, some small roles and some large roles as well. His first role was in the 1985 mini series Kane & Abel.

O'Connor has made guest appearances on some TV shows, such as Seinfeld, Beverly Hills, 90210, Sister, Sister, Silk Stalkings and Babylon 5 (in the 5th-season episode "A View from the Gallery" as Mack).

Filmography

Movies

Television

References

External links

1955 births
Living people
American male film actors
American male television actors